"Waiting for the Night" is a 2012 single by Nelly Furtado.

Waiting for the Night may also refer to:

Music

Albums
Waitin' for the Night, a 1977 album by The Runaways, or the title song
Waiting for the Night, a 1993 album by the Freddy Jones Band

Songs
"Waiting for the Night", a song by Saxon from their 1986 album Rock the Nations
"Waiting for the Night", a song by Depeche Mode from their 1990 album Violator
"Waiting for the Night", a song by Loverboy from their 1997 album Six
"Waiting for the Night" (Armin van Buuren song), a 2013 song by Armin van Buuren featuring Fiora
"Waiting for the Night", a cover of the Depeche Mode song by Swedish metal band Ghost from their 2013 album If You Have Ghost

See also
Waiting for Tonight (disambiguation)
Wait for the Night, Virgin Steele EP
Wait for Night, an album by Rick Springfield